Ruth is the second studio album by American indie folk group Nana Grizol. It was released by Orange Twin on January 10, 2010.

Track listing

Personnel

Music
 Theodore Hilton – vocals, electric guitar, acoustic guitar
 Laura Carter – drums, trumpet, clarinet
 Matte Cathcart – drums
 Robbie Cucchiaro – trumpet, euphonium, guitar, bari sax
 Jared Gandy – bass, guitar
 Patrick Jennings – piano, rhodes
 Madeline Adams – vocals, bass
 Laurel Hill – help
 Scott Spillane – help

Production
 Derek Almstead – engineer, mastering, producer
 Nana Grizol – producer

Writing Help
 James Baldwin
 Allen Ginsberg
 Michael Schneeweis
 Ryan Woods

References

2010 albums
Nana Grizol albums